Ana da Silva is a musician, best known as a founding member of post-punk rock band the Raincoats.

Career
Born in Madeira island of Portugal, she grew up without television and little access to popular culture. She had exposure to music through radio, and as a child was deeply moved by rock and roll from the Beatles and the Rolling Stones. She went to university in Lisbon studying Filologia Germânica 1968/74. Da Silva relocated to London in December 1974, and while studying at Hornsey College of Art, she formed the Raincoats with Gina Birch in 1977. She worked at the Rough Trade shop  in the Ladbroke Grove during her time in the band.

In 1984, she provided backing vocals on the Go-Betweens' "Bachelor Kisses". After releasing three albums, the Raincoats split up in 1984, da Silva going on to collaborate with drummer Charles Hayward of This Heat (one of many drummers that had passed through the Raincoats' ranks) as the duo Roseland, although they abandoned the project after recording some demos.

She went on to write music for choreographer Gaby Agis's productions, subsequently concentrated on painting. While working in a cousin's antique shop in London, she met longtime Raincoats fan Kurt Cobain, prompting him to convince DGC to reissue the band's back catalogue.

The Raincoats reformed and released a new album in 1996, but da Silva did not then produce any new music until the 2005 album The Lighthouse.

Ana da Silva performed live in London, Munich, Portugal and at the Ladyfestspain in Madrid.

Discography

Albums
2005 - The Lighthouse
2018 - Island (with Phew)

Singles
2004 - "In Awe of a Painting" / "Litany"

Books
2018 - Love, Oh Love (Rough Trade Books)

References

External links
 The official Raincoats site
 The official Ana da Silva site

Year of birth missing (living people)
Living people
People from Madeira
Women punk rock singers
20th-century Portuguese women singers
21st-century Portuguese women singers
English women guitarists
English guitarists
British post-punk musicians
The Raincoats members
University of Lisbon alumni
Portuguese expatriates in the United Kingdom
Women in punk